28th London Film Critics Circle Awards
8 February 2008

Film of the Year: 
 No Country for Old Men 

British Film of the Year: 
 Control 

The 28th London Film Critics Circle Awards, honouring the best in film for 2007, were announced by the London Film Critics Circle on 8 February 2008.

Winners and nominees

Film of the Year
No Country for Old Men
The Assassination of Jesse James by the Coward Robert Ford
The Bourne Ultimatum
There Will Be Blood
Zodiac

British Film of the Year
 Control 
Atonement
Eastern Promises
Mr. Magorium's Wonder Emporium
This Is England

Foreign Language Film of the Year
The Lives of Others • Germany
4 Months, 3 Weeks and 2 Days • Romania
The Diving Bell and the Butterfly • France
Letters from Iwo Jima • United States
Tell No One • France

Director of the Year
Paul Thomas Anderson – There Will Be Blood 
Joel Coen & Ethan Coen – No Country for Old Men
David Fincher – Zodiac
Florian Henckel von Donnersmarck – The Lives of Others
Cristian Mungiu – 4 Months, 3 Weeks and 2 Days

British Director of the Year
Paul Greengrass – The Bourne Ultimatum 
Danny Boyle – Sunshine
Anton Corbijn – Control
Shane Meadows – This Is England
Joe Wright – Atonement

Screenwriter of the Year
Florian Henckel von Donnersmarck – The Lives of Others 
Christopher Hampton – Atonement
Ronald Harwood – The Diving Bell and the Butterfly
Joel Coen & Ethan Coen – No Country for Old Men
Paul Thomas Anderson – There Will Be Blood

British Breakthrough – Filmmaking
Anton Corbijn, director – Control 
John Carney, writer and director – Once
Sarah Gavron, director – Brick Lane
Matt Greenhalgh, writer – Control
Stevan Riley, writer, director, producer – Blue Blood

Actor of the Year
Daniel Day-Lewis – There Will Be Blood 
Casey Affleck – The Assassination of Jesse James by the Coward Robert Ford
George Clooney – Michael Clayton
Tommy Lee Jones – In the Valley of Elah
Ulrich Mühe – The Lives of Others

Actress of the Year
Marion Cotillard – La Vie en Rose 
Maggie Gyllenhaal – Sherrybaby
Angelina Jolie – A Mighty Heart
Laura Linney – The Savages
Anamaria Marinca – 4 Months, 3 Weeks and 2 Days

British Actor of the Year
James McAvoy – Atonement 
Christian Bale – 3:10 to Yuma
Jim Broadbent – And When Did You Last See Your Father?
Jonny Lee Miller – The Flying Scotsman
Sam Riley – Control

British Actress of the Year
Julie Christie – Away from Her
Helena Bonham Carter – Sweeney Todd: The Demon Barber of Fleet Street
Keira Knightley – Atonement
Sienna Miller – Interview
Samantha Morton – Control

British Supporting Actor of the YearTom Wilkinson – Michael Clayton Albert Finney – Before the Devil Knows You're Dead
Toby Jones – The Painted Veil
Toby Kebbell – Control
Alfred Molina – The Hoax

British Supporting Actress of the YearKelly Macdonald – No Country for Old Men  Vanessa Redgrave – Atonement Saoirse Ronan – Atonement
Imelda Staunton – Harry Potter and the Order of the Phoenix
Tilda Swinton – Michael Clayton

British Breakthrough – ActingSam Riley – Control 'Benedict Cumberbatch – Amazing GraceDakota Blue Richards – The Golden CompassSaoirse Ronan – AtonementThomas Turgoose – This Is England''

Dilys Powell Award
Julie Walters

References

2
2007 film awards
2007 in London
2007 in British cinema